Malak Mala is a village in the Chach Valley of Attock District in Northern Punjab of Pakistan.

It lies close to the borders of Khyber Pakhtunkhwa province. Its neighboring villages include Barazai, Behbudi, Shinka, Nartopa and Ghorghushti town.

References

Villages in Attock District